Francisco Blanco Salcedo (1 January 1512 – 26 April 1581) was a Spanish Roman Catholic prelate who served as Archbishop of Santiago de Compostela (1574–1581), Bishop of Málaga (1565–1574), and Bishop of Ourense (1556–1565).

Biography
Francisco Blanco Salcedo was born in Capillas, Spain.
On 12 June 1556, he was appointed during the papacy of Pope Paul IV as Bishop of Ourense. 
On 23 August 1556, he was consecrated bishop by Pedro de la Gasca, Bishop of Palencia. On 13 April 1565, he was appointed during the papacy of Pope Pius IV as Bishop of Málaga. On 4 June 1574, he was appointed during the papacy of Pope Gregory XIII as Archbishop of Santiago de Compostela. He served as Archbishop of Santiago de Compostela until his death on 26 April 1581. While bishop, he was the principal consecrator of Juan de Sanclemente Torquemada, Bishop of Ourense (1579).

See also 
Catholic Church in Spain

References

External links and additional sources
 (for Chronology of Bishops) 
 (for Chronology of Bishops) 
 (for Chronology of Bishops) 
 (for Chronology of Bishops) 
 (for Chronology of Bishops) 
 (for Chronology of Bishops) 

16th-century Roman Catholic archbishops in Spain
1512 births
1581 deaths
Bishops appointed by Pope Paul IV
Bishops appointed by Pope Pius IV
Bishops appointed by Pope Gregory XIII